Tampereen akateeminen sinfoniaorkesteri (TASO, Tampere Academic Symphony Orchestra) is an amateur symphony orchestra in Tampere, Finland. It was founded in 2003 and provides a great opportunity for local university students - and others interested - to play in a full symphony orchestra. It consists of about 70 members - many of whom are students at the University of Tampere, Tampere University of Technology or Tampere University of Applied Sciences. TASO performs at least once every autumn and spring.

History 
The orchestra was first founded in 1998 as a string orchestra and it grew into a full symphony orchestra in 2003. Kimmo Tullila has been the conductor of the orchestra since the year 2000.

External links 
 TASO homepage

Notes

Finnish orchestras
2003 establishments in Finland
Musical groups established in 2003
Tampere
University orchestras